Colette Leloup (November 19, 1924 – October 20, 2007) was a French film executive, editor-in-chief. She went on to edit many films which included Je t'aime, Je t'aime (1968).

Filmography

Edition

1979: L'Adolescente .... Editor. (Film)
1974: Les Deux Memoires .... Film Editing. (Documentary) (Where her husband Jorge Semprún Spanish exile, interviews participants on both sides of the Spanish Civil War(1936-39) ).
1968: Je t'aime, Je t'aime .... Editor. (Film)
1966: La curée .... Assistant editor. (Film)
1960: Le Dialogue des Carmélites .... Assistant editor. (Film)
1958: Toi... le venin .... Assistant editor. (Film)
1957: Assassins et voleurs .... Assistant editor. (Film)

Personal life

On March 23, 1963, she married Jorge Semprún in Paris, France.
Colette died on October 20, 2007, and was buried in Garentreville, France. Four years later (2011), her husband Jorge Semprún was buried in the same place beside her.

References

Colette Leloup (1924 - 2007)
En el salón del gran piso de Colette Leloup, bulevar Saint-Germain, París, el verano de 1955 (¿o 1956?)

1924 births
2007 deaths
Film people from Paris
French film editors
20th-century French women
21st-century French women
Semprún family
French women film editors